Brunneifusus ternatanus, common name ternate false fusus, is a species of sea snails, marine gastropod molluscs in the family Melongenidae, the crown conches and their allies.

Description
Brunneifusus ternatanus has a shell that reaches a length of 70 – 270 mm. The shape of this shell is slender, fusiform, with a tall spire and a long siphonal canal, but it shows high degree of geographical variations in sculpture and color.  The colour is usually light brown, while the aperture  is light cream to whitish.

Distribution
This species can be found in Japan, Philippines and western Pacific.

References

 Lamarck J.B. (1816). Liste des objets représentés dans les planches de cette livraison. In: Tableau encyclopédique et méthodique des trois règnes de la Nature. Mollusques et Polypes divers. Agasse, Paris. 16 pp.
  Kosuge S. (2008). Description of Hemifusus zhangyii Kosuge, n. sp. (Gastropoda, Melongelidae). Bulletin of the Institute of Malacology, Tokyo. 3(9): 131-132, pl. 43
 Dekkers A. (2018). Two new genera in the family Melongenidae from the Indo-Pacific and comments on the identity of Hemifusus zhangyii Kosuge, 2008 and Pyrula elongata Lamarck, 1822 (Gastropoda, Neogastropoda: Buccinoidea). Gloria Maris. 57(2): 40-50
 Alf, A. & Thach, N.N. (2021). Some remarks on Lenifusus, Brunneifusus and Hemifusus and description of two new species of Hemifusus (Buccinoidea, Melongenidae). Conchylia. 52(1-2): 95-108.

External links
 Landesmuseum
 
 Discover Life
 Gmelin J.F. (1791). Vermes. In: Gmelin J.F. (Ed.) Caroli a Linnaei Systema Naturae per Regna Tria Naturae, Ed. 13. Tome 1(6). G.E. Beer, Lipsiae [Leipzig. pp. 3021-3910]

Melongenidae
Gastropods described in 1791